Only Forever is the second album by English alternative rock band Puressence, released in 1998. Only Forever displayed a clear shift in Puressence's style, It captured the group in a more positive, lighter, chart-friendly mood. The album charted at #36, this was largely thanks to the amount of play that the first single "This Feeling" received including Radio 1 and MTV.

Mani appeared as producer on the song "Standing in Your Shadow".

"Standing in Your Shadow" was used over the credits of the 1997 film Face.

Track listing
All songs written by Mudriczki, Szuminski, Matthews and McDonald.
"Sharpen Up the Knives" – 4:04
"This Feeling" – 2:59
"It Doesn't Matter Anymore" – 4:30
"Street Lights" – 3:22
"Standing in Your Shadow" – 5:13
"All I Want" – 3:09
"Behind the Man" – 1:23
"Never Be the Same Again" – 3:50
"Hey Hey I'm Down" – 4:04
"Past Believing" – 3:37
"Turn the Lights Out When I Die" – 4:03
"Gazing Down" – 7:20

Personnel

Musicians
James Mudriczki - vocals
Neil McDonald - guitar
Kevin Matthews - bass
Anthony Szuminski - drums

Technical 
Mike Hedges - producer and engineer
Peter Anderson - Photography

References

1998 albums
Puressence albums
Albums produced by Mike Hedges
Island Records albums